hectoronstiltsEP is an EP released by Hector On Stilts in 2002.

Track listing
 Bicycle
 Baby Girl
 Dirty Days
 Swords

2002 EPs